Stevanus Bungaran (born November 24, 1988 in Balikpapan) is an Indonesian professional footballer who played as a midfielder.

Club statistics

References

External links

1988 births
Living people
People from Balikpapan
Indonesian footballers
Liga 1 (Indonesia) players
Persiba Balikpapan players
Sportspeople from East Kalimantan
Association football midfielders